Jewish Book Month is an important annual event in both the North  American Jewish community and the publishing world.   It is sponsored by the Jewish Book Council. It is held annually in the month before the Chanukah gift-giving season (roughly during the month of November).   Book fairs are held in most major cities with Jewish communities, albeit not in New York, and feature lectures by visiting authors.

Jewish communities sponsor the fairs  to promote Jewish culture. For the industry, they are a major marketing tool.  According to Publishers Weekly book fairs generate over $3 million in annual revenue.  For many years the  Jewish Book Council held its annual meeting simultaneously with Book Expo America, enabling Jewish book fair planners to look over the forthcoming books and meet the authors. In 2004, this system was replaced by an annual meeting of the Jewish Book Network coordinated by the Jewish Book Council.

The beginnings of Jewish Book Month can be traced to Fanny Goldstein, a librarian at the Boston Public Library West End Branch. In 1925 she curated an exhibit of Jewish books to encourage book giving during the Jewish holiday of Chanukah. She repeated the exhibit in 1926 and this inspired a call by Rabbi S. Felix Mendelssohn of Chicago, Illinois, for the observance of a Jewish book week. The observance of Jewish Book Week was coordinated in Boston by the Boston Jewish Book Week Committee, founded in 1930 and headed by Fanny Goldstein. The National Committee for Jewish Book Week was then organized in 1940. In 1943 the Jewish Book Council took over the duties of the national committee, and Jewish Book Week was extended to become Jewish Book Month.

The Council was run by Carolyn Starman Hessel who is credited with growing Jewish Book Month and the associated book tours into one of the most important marketing events in American publishing, and a cultural center of American Jewish life, from 1994  to 2015. Hessel is credited with a knack for picking hot new novelists; she is said to have launched the careers of Nathan Englander, Myla Goldberg, Nicole Krauss and Jonathan Safran Foer by selecting them and sending them on tours of the Jewish book fairs. In 2015 Hessel was named as one of The Forward 50. Naomi Firestone-Teeter became the executive director of Jewish Book Council in 2015.

The annual meeting is, effectively, an annual author's audition. The New York Times calls it, "a bizarre rite of passage: the Jewish book tour casting call." Jeffrey Goldberg characterized the audition as an experience "somewhere between JDate and a camel auction." Authors of books that range from serious works of religious history to comic novels stand and speak for precisely two minutes to an audience of over one hundred organizers of Jewish book fairs and lecture series. Getting signed to a tour of these venues is said to have the power not merely to launch a Jewish-themed book, but to lift titles from Jewish to general success.

See also
 Jewish Book Week

References

Jewish American literature
Jews and Judaism in the United States
Publishing organizations
Jewish printing and publishing